Alan Robert Copeland (October 6, 1926 – December 28, 2022), also known as Weaver Copeland, was an American singer, songwriter, composer, and conductor.

Life and career
Copeland was born in Los Angeles, California on October 6, 1926.

Copeland was a member of The Modernaires, first from 1948 to 1956 and then from 1959 to the mid-1960s. He also worked as a songwriter in Los Angeles in the 1950s. He co-wrote the song "Make Love to Me", "Back Where I Belong", "Darling, Darling, Darling", "High Society", "Into the Shadows", "This Must Be the Place", "Too Young to Know", and "While the Vesper Bells Were Ringing". He also worked as a composer for television and did arrangement work for musicians such as Ella Fitzgerald, Frank Sinatra, and Bing Crosby. He led studio ensembles that released several albums in the 1960s. In 1968, he issued the single, "Mission: Impossible Theme / Norwegian Wood", which was a medley interpolating the Theme from Mission: Impossible and the Beatles song "Norwegian Wood". It peaked at number 120 on the Billboard Bubbling Under chart and won a Grammy Award for Best Contemporary Pop Performance by a Chorus. He released his autobiography, "Jukebox Saturday Nights", in November 2007.

Copeland died in Sonora, California on December 28, 2022, at the age of 96.

Discography
No Sad Songs for Me (Coral, 1957)
Cool Country (ABC, 1966)
Basie Swingin' Voices Singin', with Count Basie (ABC-Paramount, 1966)
A Bubble Called You (ABC, 1967)
If Love Comes With It (A&M, 1969)
Enchanting Woodwinds (Reader's Digest, year unknown)

References

1926 births
2022 deaths
Songwriters from California
American conductors (music)
American male conductors (music)
American male composers
Glenn Miller Orchestra members
American male songwriters